Beaver Dam Unified School District is a public school district in the city of Beaver Dam, Wisconsin.

References

External links
 Beaver Dam Unified School District

Education in Dodge County, Wisconsin
School districts in Wisconsin
Beaver Dam, Wisconsin